Kothi State (or Koti State) was a princely state of the British Raj. It belonged to the Bagelkhand Agency of Central India. Its capital was at Kothi, in modern Satna district of Madhya Pradesh.

It was a relatively small Sanad

History
Kothi State was founded at an uncertain date by a Rajput ruler who expelled the former Bharr ruler of the area.

Towards the beginning of the nineteenth century, and in much the same manner as neighbouring Sohawal, Kothi became a British protectorate initially subordinate to Panna State. However, a separate sanad was granted to Rais Lal Duniyapati Singh in 1810.

The last ruler of Kothi signed the instrument of accession to the Indian Union on 1 January 1950.

Rulers
Rulers adopted the title Raja Bahadur.

Title Rais
180. – ....                Lal Duniyapati Singh
.... – 1862                Lal Abdhut Singh
1862 – 5 June 1887         Ran Bahadur Singh

Title Raja Bahadur
1887 – 1895                Bhagwat Bahadur Singh
1895 – 8 August 1914       Avadhendra Singh
1914 – 1934                Sitaram Pratap Bahadur Singh
1934 – 1948                Kaushalendra Pratap Singh
1948 -2017                Govind pratap singh ju dev

See also
Political integration of India
Vindhya Pradesh

References

Princely states of India
Satna district
Rajputs
18th-century establishments in India
1950 disestablishments in India